Labour Russia (LR or TR; ; Trudovaya Rossiya, TR) is a hard-line communist movement in Russia. It was founded in 1991 as a popular movement supporting the Russian Communist Workers Party (RKRP) and was led by Viktor Anpilov. Apart from the RKRP activists, the movement included activists from other radical opposition groups, e.g. the United Front of Workers, the Union of Communists, the Union of Officers etc. In 1995, the organisation took part in the legislative election in the list 'Communists - Labour Russia - For the Soviet Union'. The Labour Russia movement earned notoriety in the 1990s with aggressive anti-government demonstrators, e.g. the 1993 May Day demonstration that turned into riots. Anpilov used both communist and ultranationalist rhetoric. Viktor Anpilov was also one of the initiators of the armed rebellion in October 1993 in Moscow.

References

1991 establishments in Russia
Communist parties in Russia
Direct democracy parties
Far-left politics in Russia
Left-wing nationalist parties
Nationalist parties in Russia
Neo-Sovietism
Neo-Stalinist parties
Political parties established in 1991
Russian nationalist parties
Political organizations based in Russia